Shahrud County is in Semnan province, Iran. The capital of the county is the city of Shahrud. At the 2006 census, the county's population was 225,007 in 62,196 households. The following census in 2011 counted 238,830 people in 70,598 households. At the 2016 census, the county's population was 218,628 in 69,723 households, by which time Meyami District had been separated from the county to become Meyami County.

Administrative divisions

The population history and structural changes of Shahrud County's administrative divisions over three consecutive censuses are shown in the following table. The latest census shows three districts, seven rural districts, and six cities.

Notable natives and residents
Bayazid Bastami, 9th century Sufi
Abu al-Hassan al-Kharaqani (963-1033), Sufi
Abbas Foroughi Bastami (1798-1857), poet

References

 

Counties of Semnan Province